East Garioch is one of the nineteen wards used to elect members of the Aberdeenshire Council. Until 2017 three councillors were elected in this ward following the fifth statutory Local Government Boundary Commission for Scotland review 2016, now East Garioch elects four Councillors.

Councillors

Election Results

2022 Election
2022 Aberdeenshire Council election

2017 Election
2017 Aberdeenshire Council election

2012 Election
2012 Aberdeenshire Council election

2007 Election
2007 Aberdeenshire Council election

By-election
The by-election was held on 17 June 2021, following the death of Councillor Fergus Hood following a prolonged illness.

2021 By-election
East Garioch By-election 2021 - Aberdeenshire Council

References

Wards of Aberdeenshire